Salso Lake is a lake in the Province of Foggia, Apulia, Italy.

Lakes of Apulia